Weiherhammer is a municipality in the district of Neustadt an der Waldnaab in Bavaria, Germany.

History
Weiherhammer, originally Beckendorf, belonged to the Wittelsbach duchy Neuburg-Sulzbach. Since 1777 it was the a part of the Bavaria electorate. In 1934 Beckendorf was renamed Weiherhammer and received communal autonomy in 1952. In 1972 Dürnast and Trippach were incorporated into Weiherhammer.

Population
In 1970 the population was 3,406; in 1987, 3,655; and in 2000, 4,199.

Industry

References

Neustadt an der Waldnaab (district)